Boing, We'll Do It Live! is the first live album of The Aristocrats, released on December 10, 2012. Footage and sound for this release were recorded in two concerts held at Alvas Showroom in Los Angeles, California. During those concerts the band played material from their debut album as well as songs from each band members' solo projects. The album was released on double-CD and DVD. The deluxe edition consists of both the DVD and the two CDs including two bonus tracks not featured on standard editions.

Track listing

Disc 1

Disc 2

DVD features
 Complete show, including bonus tracks and additional between song footage
 5.1 surround mix by Steven Wilson
 Bonus audio from soundcheck
 Interviews with each band member

Personnel
Guthrie Govan – guitar
Bryan Beller – bass
Marco Minnemann – drums

See also
Fuck It, We'll Do It Live

References

2012 live albums
Live jazz fusion albums
The Aristocrats (band) albums